Phyllodactylus benedettii is a species of gecko. It is endemic to Jalisco, Mexico.

References

Phyllodactylus
Endemic reptiles of Mexico
Reptiles described in 2018
Natural history of Jalisco